Osborn, also known as Osburn, is an unincorporated community in Perry County, Alabama, United States. A post office operated under the name Osburn from 1903 to 1905.

References

Unincorporated communities in Perry County, Alabama
Unincorporated communities in Alabama